The Nadelhorn (4,327 m) is a mountain in the Pennine Alps in Switzerland. It is the highest point on the Nadelgrat, a high-level ridge running roughly north–south above the resort of Saas-Fee to the east, and the Mattertal to the west. Its three ridges join to form a sharp-pointed summit, which looks like a needle (German: Nadel) when seen from the north. The other summits on the Nadelgrat are the Stecknadelhorn and Hohberghorn.

It was first climbed by Franz Andenmatten, Baptiste Epiney, Aloys Supersaxo and J. Zimmermann on 16 September 1858.

See also

List of 4000 metre peaks of the Alps

References
 Dumler, Helmut and Willi P. Burkhardt, The High Mountains of the Alps, London: Diadem, 1994

External links
 The Nadelhorn on SummitPost
 The Nadelgrat on SummitPost

Alpine four-thousanders
Mountains of the Alps
Mountains of Valais
Pennine Alps
Mountains of Switzerland
Four-thousanders of Switzerland